This is a list of reservoirs in Bulgaria:

Note: In Bulgaria, a dam (Bulgarian язовир) is often used to refer the body of water, rather than the structure. It signifies that the body of water is man-made instead of natural.

See also
 List of lakes in Bulgaria
 List of rivers of Bulgaria
 List of dams and reservoirs

reservoirs
reservoirs
Bulgaria